Century City is a neighborhood in Los Angeles, California, United States.

Century City may also refer to:

Places
 Century City (building), a former design for what is now 100 St Georges Terrace in Perth, Western Australia
 Century City, Cape Town, South Africa
 Century City, Makati, Philippines
Century City Mall
 Qianjiang Century City, Hangzhou, Zhejiang Province, China
 Century City station (disambiguation)

Arts and entertainment
 Century City (TV series), an American science fiction-legal drama
 "Century City", a song by Tom Petty & the Heartbreakers from the 1979 album Damn the Torpedoes

See also

 Central City (disambiguation)